The 2012 Atkins Curling Supplies Women's Classic was held from October 12 to 15 at the East St. Paul Curling Club in Winnipeg, Manitoba as part of the 2012–13 World Curling Tour. The event was held in a round robin format, and the purse for the event was CAD$15,000.

Teams
The teams are listed as follows:

Round-robin standings
Final round-robin standings

Tiebreaker

Playoffs

References

External links

Atkins Curling Supplies Women's Classic
Atkins Curling Supplies Women's Classic
Atkins Curling Supplies Women's Classic
Curling competitions in Winnipeg